Sehwan (also commonly referred to as Sehwan Sharif or Noble Sehwan) is a historic city located in Jamshoro District of Sindh province in Pakistan and on the west bank of the Indus  north-west of Hyderabad. The city is renowned for being home of one of Pakistan's most important Sufi shrines, the Shrine of Lal Shahbaz Qalandar.The city also holds the status of taluka under Jamshoro District. It was previously under Dadu District however, after establishing the Jamshoro District, Sehwan was linked with Jamshoro District.

Owing to the popularity of its Sufi shrine, the terms "Sehwan" and "Qalandar" are often used interchangeably in Pakistan. Sehwan is one of Pakistan's most important spiritual centres, along with other shrines such as the Shrine of Abdullah Shah Ghazi in Karachi, Data Durbar Complex in Lahore, Bari Imam in Noorpur Shehan near Islamabad, and the lustrous tombs of the Suhrawardi Sufis in Multan.

History 

Sehwan is probably the most ancient place in Sindh. Some historians say that this town is as ancient as the period of Prophet Shees, son of Adam. Hence it was named as Sheestan, Sewistan and then Sehwan. According to Syed Muhibullah, author of "A brief history of Sind", Sehwan was the name of great grandson of Ham (son of Noah). But there are various other views about the nomenclature of Sehwan as well. William Dalrymple says that the name is derived from Shivistan after Lord Shiva. This place in Sind saw amalgamation of Hinduism and Islam.Notable historian Molai Sheedai writes in his book "Tarikh e Tamadan e Sind" that Sehwan was built by the Sewi Aryas and hence was called Sewistan. Another view is that its name was Sindomana, a name which is well mentioned in Greek literature. Sindhu-mán is Sanskrit word, which means "the possessor (the capital, or Raja) of Sindh, with which Sindhu-vàn is synonymous, the latter may have been softened in common speech to the modern Seh-wan. Sindomana was the capital of King Sambos, who was defeated by Alexander in 326 BC. A large tell called Kafir Qila (castle of the pagans) is located at the centre of the city. 

Sehwan was conquered by Muhammad bin Qasim in 711 from son of the King Dahir, and three centuries later by Mahmud of Ghazni in 1026. In all the subsequent dynastic struggles of Sindh, Sehwan continued to feature prominently. It was held successively by the Sumrahs, the Summas, the Arghuns and the Tarkhans. It was the capital of Thatta Kingdom, when an abortive attempt was made by the Mughal emperor Humayun to capture it on his way to Umarkot in 1542, but it finally fell to his son Akbar in 1590s. After the Mughals, it was ruled by Kalhoras and Talpurs. The city is known for its Sufi patron saint Lal Shahbaz Qalandar who lived there in the 13th century.

The Shrine of Lal Shahbaz Qalandar attracts hundreds of thousands of visitors every year. Shrine of Murshid Nadir Ali Shah, a notable spiritual descendant of Lal Shahbaz Qalandar is also located in Sehwan, where large number of people are served free meals round the clock. Another famous place is the inverted city. Manchar Lake, the largest freshwater lake in Pakistan, which is at a short distance from Sehwan Sharif.

Incident 

On 16 February 2017, a suicide bomber triggered an explosion at the Shrine of Lal Shahbaz Qalandar, killing at least 83 people and injuring almost 250. The attack occurred during a praying session. The bombing took place at an 800 year old Shrine. Later the ISIS claimed responsibility for this terrorist attack stating that their 'martyr' had detonated a vest at the popular Shia gathering at the shrine.

See also 
Lal Shahbaz Qalandar
Bodla Bahar
Nadir Ali Shah
Sehwan Sharif Airport

References

External links 
http://epaperbeta.timesofindia.com/Article.aspx?eid=31812&articlexml=FOR-THE-RECORD-Outcome-of-the-Sufi-Salafi-19022017016019

Populated places in Jamshoro District
Talukas of Sindh
Lal Shahbaz Qalandar